Tapora is a locality on the Okahukura Peninsula, which is on the eastern side of the Kaipara Harbour in New Zealand. It is part of the Rodney District. Wellsford lies to the East, as does Port Albert and the Wharehine River, while Manukapua Island lies to the West.

Early history
Early history of Maori tells how the western shores of Okahukura once extended to the entrance of the Kaipara Harbour as sand dunes with two channels into the harbour instead of one, as it is now.  This portion of land that was more or less sand dunes was known as Tapora, and was inhabited by the Maori.  Great storms gradually caused the sand dunes to drift away, allowing the sea to encroach, leaving only sand bars in the harbour where there was once a whare or large temple on the original sand dunes.

The name Okahukura refers to Kahukura, one of the rangatira who arrived to New Zealand aboard the Tākitimu migratory waka.

For ten generations the land of Okahukura remained in the possession of Ngati Whatua. For more than ten years after the Government had purchased the neighbouring land known as Albertland, the peninsula was occupied by the Ngati Whatua tribe.

FitzGerald built his first homestead around 1880 on a ridge overlooking Oruawharo River. Here he built a jetty for small boats for access when there was sufficient high tide, but there was a main landing point in deeper water for any tide. Due to the large number of kauri trees, FitzGerald leased the rights of this land to gum-diggers. Due to old age FitzGerald had to retire and terminate his twenty years of occupancy at Okahukura.

Following FitzGerald's retirement A. H. Walker leased this land for two and a half years and dramatically changed the landscape by re-fencing and sowing grass.  T.C. Williams now leased the land with W. Williams taking over management.  For the next ten years Williams and his workers spent many days cutting and burning down bush to allow for sowing grasslands, while opening gumfields and a store at one of FitzGerald's old homes.  In the year 1910 Williams was in the process of transferring the management of the block to C. Kemp, when he accidentally fatally shot himself.  Kemp took over management of Okahukura, continuing with the development of boundary fences. Nearer the end of 1910 Okahukura was sold to Messrs Bowron and Smith of Christchurch.  Kemp was still manager of the Okahukura property and split the property up, selling sections to others and developed roads for access into the new sections as well as communications through a telephone line. The land changed ownership numerous times between World War One and World War Two.

Recent history

During World War Two the United States Marines set up camp on 'the run' (Sea View) and used the greater area for target practice. The New Zealand Government then took over Okahukura to use as a soldier rehabilitation settlement in April 1945. The name Okahukura was then changed to Tapora to avoid confusion with another Okahukura elsewhere in New Zealand.

The Minister of 'Land and Returned Services' Association brokered a pact to develop the Okahukura peninsula for returned servicemen through ballots. A community to be called Tapora was planned with a shop, school, church and workers' houses (only the school and a few houses were constructed). The ballots for the Returned Services' Association were created in 1947 and Tapora turned into a dairy farming settlement.

In 2006 Pierre and Jackie Chatelanat gifted Atiu Creek Regional Park to the Auckland Regional Council.

In 2013 a substantial fire which began near Okahukura Road burned through 85ha of land at Tapora, much of it wild pines, Gorse, Pampas Grass and coastal scrub/conservation land.

In recent years, many of the Dairy Farms in Tapora were converted to Orchards, with tens of thousands of Avocado Trees planted.

Demographics
The SA1 area is part of the larger Okahukura Peninsula statistical area.

The SA1 statistical area had a population of 123 at the 2018 New Zealand census, an increase of 9 people (7.9%) since the 2013 census, and an increase of 6 people (5.1%) since the 2006 census. There were 36 households, comprising 66 males and 57 females, giving a sex ratio of 1.16 males per female. The median age was 35.2 years (compared with 37.4 years nationally), with 27 people (22.0%) aged under 15 years, 24 (19.5%) aged 15 to 29, 54 (43.9%) aged 30 to 64, and 15 (12.2%) aged 65 or older.

Ethnicities were 80.5% European/Pākehā, 31.7% Māori, 4.9% Pacific peoples, and 2.4% Asian. People may identify with more than one ethnicity.

Although some people chose not to answer the census's question about religious affiliation, 63.4% had no religion, 24.4% were Christian and 2.4% had other religions.

Of those at least 15 years old, 3 (3.1%) people had a bachelor's or higher degree, and 27 (28.1%) people had no formal qualifications. The median income was $31,400, compared with $31,800 nationally. 12 people (12.5%) earned over $70,000 compared to 17.2% nationally. The employment status of those at least 15 was that 48 (50.0%) people were employed full-time, 12 (12.5%) were part-time, and 3 (3.1%) were unemployed.

Okahukura Peninsula

Okahukura Peninsula had a population of 1,491 at the 2018 New Zealand census, an increase of 132 people (9.7%) since the 2013 census, and an increase of 111 people (8.0%) since the 2006 census. There were 522 households, comprising 777 males and 714 females, giving a sex ratio of 1.09 males per female. The median age was 41.7 years (compared with 37.4 years nationally), with 306 people (20.5%) aged under 15 years, 234 (15.7%) aged 15 to 29, 732 (49.1%) aged 30 to 64, and 216 (14.5%) aged 65 or older.

Ethnicities were 88.3% European/Pākehā, 20.5% Māori, 3.2% Pacific peoples, 3.2% Asian, and 1.0% other ethnicities. People may identify with more than one ethnicity.

The percentage of people born overseas was 15.9, compared with 27.1% nationally.

Although some people chose not to answer the census's question about religious affiliation, 56.9% had no religion, 31.0% were Christian, 0.8% had Māori religious beliefs, 0.6% were Hindu, 0.2% were Muslim and 1.2% had other religions.

Of those at least 15 years old, 141 (11.9%) people had a bachelor's or higher degree, and 225 (19.0%) people had no formal qualifications. The median income was $32,600, compared with $31,800 nationally. 162 people (13.7%) earned over $70,000 compared to 17.2% nationally. The employment status of those at least 15 was that 639 (53.9%) people were employed full-time, 198 (16.7%) were part-time, and 39 (3.3%) were unemployed.

Notable Sites 

 Atiu Creek Regional Park
 Bird's Beach
 Tapora Golf Club
 Tapora Hall
 Tapora Reserve (playground, seating and Tennis Courts)
 Tapora School

Education

Notes

Rodney Local Board Area
Populated places in the Auckland Region
Populated places around the Kaipara Harbour